Toivo is a masculine given name most commonly found in Estonia and Finland and may refer to:
Andimba Toivo ya Toivo (1924–2017), Namibian politician and anti-Apartheid activist
Sigrid Elmblad (1860–1926), Swedish journalist, poet, translator and writer who wrote under the pseudonym Toivo
Toivo Aalto-Setälä (1896–1977), Finnish politician
Toivo Aare (1944–1999), Estonian journalist
Toivo Alavirta (1890–1940), Finnish journalist and politician
Toivo Antikainen (1898–1941), Finnish communist and military officer
Toivo Aro (1887–1962), Finnish diver and Olympic competitor
Toivo Aronen (1886–1973), Finnish politician
Toivo Asmer (born 1947), Estonian racing driver, motorsports promoter, musician and politician
Toivo Haapanen (1889–1950), conductor and music scholar
Toivo Halonen (1893–1984), Finnish politician
Toivo Harjunpää (1910–1995), Finnish-born American Lutheran priest and professor
Toivo Horelli (1888–1975), Finnish politician
Toivo Hörkkö (1898–1975), Finnish cyclist and Olympic competitor
Toivo Hyytiäinen (1925–1978), Finnish athlete, javelin thrower and Olympic medalist
Toivo Ikonen (1891–1976), Finnish politician
Toivo Jaatinen (born 1926), Finnish sculptor
Toivo Jürgenson (born 1957), Estonian engineer, entrepreneur and politician
Toivo Kärki (1915–1992), Finnish composer, musician, music producer and arranger
Toivo Kinnunen (1905–1977), Finnish politician
Toivo Mikael Kivimäki (1886–1968), Finnish ambassador, professor, politician and former Prime Minister of Finland
Toivo Koljonen (1912–1943), Finnish criminal, last Finn executed for a civilian crime
Toivo Kujala (1894–1959), Finnish politician
Toivo Kuula (1883–1918), Finnish conductor and composer
Toivo Hjalmar Långström (1889–1983), Finnish politician and trade union activist
Toivo Loukola (1902–1984), Finnish athlete, runner and Olympic medalist
Toivo Maimets (born 1957), Estonian biologist and politician
Toivo Mäkelä (1909–1979), Finnish film actor
Toivo Ndjebela (born ????), Namibian journalist and newspaper editor
Toivo Oikarinen (born 1924), Finnish cross country skier and Olympic competitor
Toivo Ovaska (1899–1966), Finnish speed skater and Olympic competitor
Toivo Paloposki (1928–1991), Finnish archivist and historian
Toivo Pawlo (1917–1979), Swedish film actor
Toivo Pohjala (1888–1969), Finnish wrestler and Olympic competitor
Ivo Reingoldt (1906–1941), Finnish swimmer and Olympic competitor
Toivo Salonen (born 1933), Finnish speed skater and Olympic medalist
Toivo Särkkä (1890–1975), Finnish film producer and director
Toivo Sukari (born 1954), Finnish businessman
Toivo Suursoo (born 1975), Estonian ice hockey player
Toivo Tikkanen (1888–1947), Finnish architect, sport shooter and Olympic medalist
Toivo Tootsen (born 1943), Estonian journalist, writer and politician
Toivo Uustalo (born 1946), Estonian politician 
Toivo Vähä (1901–1984), Finnish-born colonel of the KGB
Toivo Vaikvee (born 1947), Danish-born New Zealand cricketer

References

Estonian masculine given names
Finnish masculine given names